The 2010–11 Leinster Rugby season was Leinster's tenth competing in the Celtic League, alongside which they competed in the 2010–11 Heineken Cup. The Leinster 'A' team competed in the British and Irish Cup for their second season.

Leinster reached the 2011 Celtic League Grand Final in Thomond Park, Limerick against Munster, after finishing 2nd in the league format & beating Ulster in the semi-finals, however Leinster were beaten by Munster who had won the league twice before. In the Heineken Cup, Leinster finished top of their pool which consisted of Clermont Auvergne, Racing Metro and Saracens. Leinster beat Leicester Tigers in the quarter-finals & Stade Toulousain in the semi-finals. Leinster beat Northampton Saints in the 2011 Heineken Cup Final in the Millennium Stadium in Cardiff to win the Heineken Cup for their second time. The Leinster 'A' team were beaten by the Bedford Blues in the British & Irish Cup Quarter-Finals.

Squad

Coaching and Management team
The current coaching team will change at the end of 2009–10 with Michael Cheika departing after 5 seasons. Cheika will be replaced by current Clermont backs coach Josef Schmidt. Schmidt is joining on a three-year contract and the rest of the coaching team will be announced before the end of the 2009–10 season.

Playing Squad 2010/2011

Bold indicates full international capped played.

In for 2010–11
  Isaac Boss (from Ulster)
  Mariano Galarza (from Universitario de La Plata)
  Ed O'Donoghue (from Ulster)
  Heinke van der Merwe (from Golden Lions)

Promoted from the Leinster Academy
  Niall Moris
  Andrew Conway
  Brendan Macken
  Jack McGrath
  Eoin Sherrif
  Paul Ryan
  Dominic Ryan
  Rhys Ruddock
  Ian Madigan

Out for 2010–11
  Malcolm O'Kelly (retiring)
  Girvan Dempsey (retiring)
  Mariano Galarza to Pampas XV
  Bernard Jackman (retiring)
  Chris Keane
  CJ van der Linde to Cheetahs

Celtic League

Table

Fixtures

Semi-final

Final

Heineken Cup

Pool table

Fixtures

Pool stage

Quarter-final

Semi-final

Final

British & Irish Cup

Pool stage

Fixtures

Pool stage

Quarter-final

References

External links
Official website

2010–11
2010–11 Celtic League by team
2010–11 in Irish rugby union
2010–11 Heineken Cup by team